Kevin Draxinger (born March 16, 1967) is a former backstroke swimmer from Canada, who competed for his native country at the 1992 Summer Olympics in Barcelona, Spain.  There he finished in the twelfth position in the 200-metre backstroke. In the same event he won the silver medal at the 1994 Commonwealth Games.

At the 1991 Summer Universiade, Draxinger won a silver medal in the 200-metre backstroke.

He obtained an MD degree from  the University of British Columbia (Vancouver, Canada) in 1998, and further specialized himself in Orthopedic and spinal surgery at McGill University (Montreal, Canada) and Johns Hopkins University (Baltimore). Draxinger now serves a Sports medicine and Orthopedic surgery Physician in Freeport, Illinois, working for the Freeport Health Network at their Burchard Hills offices.

See also
 List of Commonwealth Games medallists in swimming (men)

References

External links

1967 births
Living people
Canadian male backstroke swimmers
Commonwealth Games silver medallists for Canada
Olympic swimmers of Canada
Swimmers from Vancouver
Swimmers at the 1992 Summer Olympics
Swimmers at the 1994 Commonwealth Games
UBC Thunderbirds swimmers
Commonwealth Games medallists in swimming
Commonwealth Games bronze medallists for Canada
Swimmers at the 1990 Commonwealth Games
Universiade medalists in swimming
Universiade silver medalists for Canada
Medalists at the 1991 Summer Universiade
20th-century Canadian people
21st-century Canadian people
Medallists at the 1990 Commonwealth Games
Medallists at the 1994 Commonwealth Games